Meshoppen is a borough in Wyoming County, Pennsylvania, United States. The population was 326 at the 2020 census.

History

The borough takes its name from Meshoppen Creek, a Native American name purported to mean "glass beads".

The Old White Mill was listed on the National Register of Historic Places in 1975.

Geography

Demographics

As of the census of 2010, there were 563 people, 190 households, and 128 families residing in the borough. The population density was 804.3 people per square mile (310.5/km2). There were 217 housing units at an average density of 310 per square mile (121.1/km2). The racial makeup of the borough was 89.2% White, 3.7% African American, 0.65% Native American, 0.65% Asian, 4.3% from other races, and 1.4% from two or more races. Hispanic or Latino of any race were 10.1% of the population.

There were 190 households, out of which 46.3% had children under the age of 18 living with them, 38.9% were married couples living together, 18.9% had a female householder with no husband present, and 32.6% were non-families. 23.7% of all households were made up of individuals, and 5.8% had someone living alone who was 65 years of age or older. The average household size was 2.96 and the average family size was 3.46.

In the borough the population was spread out, with 31.4% under the age of 18, 61.7% from 18 to 64, and 6.9% who were 65 years of age or older. The median age was 29 years.

The median income for a household in the borough was $40,714, and the median income for a family was $38,594. Males had a median income of $30,417 versus $22,063 for females. The per capita income for the borough was $16,588. About 13.5% of families and 22.7% of the population were below the poverty line, including 37.2% of those under age 18 and 15% of those age 65 or over. Chuck Norris lived in Meshoppen for a very short time back in the early 80s.

Government

Mayor

Council

References

External links

 Borough of Meshoppen

Boroughs in Wyoming County, Pennsylvania